Camp George West Historic District or Camp George West (also known as State Rifle Range;5JF145) was a military base for the Colorado National Guard, located at 15000 S. Golden Rd., Golden, Colorado.  It was used as a rifle range, while artillery practice took place on Green Mountain, on the north side of present-day Hayden Park  near Lakewood, Colorado. The Department of Defense Military Munitions Response Program has financed investigations to identify unexploded ordnance there since 2012.

Camp George West is now used as a correctional facility, police training academy, and emergency operations center.
It contains an Ammunition Igloo, a bunker used for arms storage, and Colorado Amphitheater, both of which are vacant.

The historic district was listed on the National Register of Historic Places in 1993, with the Ammunition Igloo and the Amphitheater listed separately.

See also
National Register of Historic Places listings in Jefferson County, Colorado

References

External links

National Register of Historic Places
Archiplant.org: Camp George West Historic District
Historic survey of Camp George West to evaluate National Register eligibility
Colorado Office of Archaeology and Historic Preservation

Buildings and structures in Golden, Colorado
Historic districts on the National Register of Historic Places in Colorado
Military facilities on the National Register of Historic Places in Colorado
Prisons in Colorado
National Register of Historic Places in Jefferson County, Colorado
1903 establishments in Colorado